Nir is a male given name of Hebrew origin which means "plowed field". It is also used as a Hebraized surname. Examples of people with that name:

Given name 
 Nir Abergel (born 1990), Israeli footballer
 Nir Alon (born 1964), Israeli sculptor and an installation artist
 Nir Baram (born 1976), Israeli author
 Nir Barkat (born 1959), Israeli businessman, entrepreneur, philanthropist, and politician
 Nir Barzilai, biologist
 Nir Berkovic (born 1982), former Israeli footballer
 Nir Bitton (born 1991), Israeli professional footballer
 Nir Cohen (born 1981), Israeli retired basketball player
 Nir Davidovich (born 1976), former Israeli goalkeeper
 Nir Felder (born 1982), American jazz guitarist, composer, and songwriter
 Nir Friedman (born 1967), Israeli professor
 Nir Hod (born 1970), Israeli artist based in New York
 Nir Jacob Kaplan (born 1989), Israeli actor, entertainer, and a radio presenter
 Nir Kabaretti (born 1968), Israeli orchestra conductor
 Nir Klinger (born 1966)
 Nir Lax (born 1994), Israeli footballer
 Nir Levine (born 1962), Israeli footballer and football manager
 Nir Malhi (born 1955), Israeli martial arts teacher, founder of Cheng Ming Israel
 Nir Nachum (born 1983), Israeli football player
 Nir Nakav, Israeli drummer
 Nir Poraz (1971–1994), Israeli Defence Forces captain
 Nir Rosen (born 1977), American journalist and chronicler
 Nir Seroussi (born 1970), music executive, producer, and songwriter
 Nir Shavit, Israeli computer scientist
 Nir Shaviv (born 1972), Israeli‐American physics professor
 Nir Shental (born 1969), Israeli Olympic competitive sailor
 Nir Sivilia (born 1975), former Israeli footballer
 Nir Tibor (born 1993), known as Dennis Lloyd, Israeli musician, producer, and songwriter
 Nir Welgreen (born 1976), former professional tennis player from Israel
 Nir Yaniv (born 1972), Israeli musician, author and editor
 Nir Yusim (born 1978), Israeli badminton player
 Nir Zidkyahu (born 1967), studio-session drummer

Surname 
Itzhak Nir (born 1940), Israeli Olympic competitive sailor
Shlomit Nir (born 1952), Israeli Olympic swimmer

See also 

Nia (given name)
 NIR (disambiguation)

References 

Hebrew-language given names